bump.y is a girl idol group, founded in 2009 by .

The concept of the group is to bring six actresses together as an idol group; the group's name is an acronym and each member's attributed characteristic is supposed to correspond to each component of the acronym: Brilliant, Universal, Miracle, Power, the period is intended to represent "moving freely", and finally Youthful. The group "graduated" in end of June 2014.

Members

Current members 
 , born 
 Nanami Sakuraba
 Sara Takatsuki
 , born 
 , born

Discography

Singles

CD singles

Digital singles

References

External links 
  

Japanese pop music groups
Japanese girl groups
Japanese idol groups
Musical groups established in 2009
2009 establishments in Japan
Pony Canyon artists
Musical quintets